Ruth Haas is an American mathematician and professor at the University of Hawaii at Manoa. Previously she was the Achilles Professor of Mathematics at Smith College. She received the M. Gweneth Humphreys Award from the Association for Women in Mathematics (AWM) in 2015 for her mentorship of women in mathematics.  Haas was named an inaugural AWM Fellow in 2017. In 2017 she was elected President of the AWM and on February 1, 2019 she assumed that position.

Education
Haas received her Bachelor of Arts from Swarthmore College, her Master of Science from Cornell University, and her Ph.D. from Cornell University in 1987. Prior to becoming a professor at the University of Hawaii, Haas was Achilles Professor of Mathematics and Statistics at Smith College.

Career
Ruth Haas was a driving force in the strong and vibrant mathematics community at Smith College, where she taught for many years.  At Smith Haas was instrumental in establishing the Center for Women in Mathematics and the highly-successful post-baccalaureate program at Smith. There is a plethora of other academic and community-building initiatives developed and supported by Haas, including a highly effective undergraduate research course, the annual Women In Mathematics In the Northeast (WIMIN) conference, a program for junior visitors, a high school outreach program, and weekly seminars. The AWM honored Ruth Haas’s outstanding achievements in inspiring undergraduate women to discover and pursue their passion for mathematics and eventually becoming mathematicians by awarding her the 2015 M. Gweneth Humphreys Award.

References

External links
 

American women mathematicians
Cornell University alumni
20th-century American mathematicians
21st-century American mathematicians
Living people
University of Hawaiʻi faculty
Year of birth missing (living people)
Smith College faculty
Mathematicians from Hawaii
Fellows of the Association for Women in Mathematics
Swarthmore College alumni
20th-century women mathematicians
21st-century women mathematicians
20th-century American women
21st-century American women